Amasa Learned (November 15, 1750 – May 4, 1825) was an American preacher, lawyer, and politician from New London, Connecticut. He served in the state's House of Representatives and represented Connecticut in the U.S. House from 1791 until 1795.

Early life and career
Learned was born in Killingly in the Connecticut Colony, the son of Deacon Ebenezer Learned and Keziah (Leavens) Learned. He was prepared for college by a private tutor and graduated from Yale College in 1772. Learned taught in the Union School in New London. He studied theology, received a license from the Windham Association in October 1773, and preached for a short time before entering politics.

While living in Killingly, Learned began the study of law in 1778. He was elected a member of the Connecticut House of Representatives in 1779. After moving to New London, he served again in the Connecticut House of Representatives from 1785 to 1791. He was a member of the convention which ratified the Constitution of the United States in 1788.

Learned was elected to the upper house of assistants in 1791, and elected as a Pro-Administration candidate to the Second and Third Congresses, serving from March 4, 1791, to March 3, 1795. He engaged in land speculations while serving in Congress.

After serving in Congress, he was a delegate to the state constitutional convention in 1818.

Death
Learned died in New London on May 4, 1825, and is interred in the Cedar Grove Cemetery in New London.

Personal life
Learned married Grace Hallam in 1773. They had four children, Nicholas H. Learned, Frances Learned Chew, Ebenezer Learned and Edward Learned.

Learned's grandson, John Law, served as United States Representative from Indiana.

References

External links
 Biographical Directory of the United States Congress
 
 The Political Graveyard
 Govtrack.us

Members of the Connecticut General Assembly Council of Assistants (1662–1818)
Members of the Connecticut House of Representatives
Members of the United States House of Representatives from Connecticut
1750 births
1825 deaths
Yale College alumni